A  is a length of time roughly equal to the potential lifetime of a person or, equivalently, the complete renewal of a human population.

Background
Originally it meant the time from the moment that something happened (for example the founding of a city) until the point in time that all people who had lived at the first moment had died. At that point a new  would start.

In 17 BC, Caesar Augustus organized Ludi saeculares ("saecular games") for the first time to celebrate the "fifth saeculum of Rome".

In 248, Philip the Arab combined Ludi saeculares with the 1000th anniversary of the founding of Rome. The new millennium that Rome entered was called the saeculum novum, a term that received a metaphysical connotation in Christianity, referring to the worldly age (hence "secular").

This results in the modern sense of 'secular' as 'belonging to the world and its affairs'.

The English word secular, an adjective meaning something happening once in an eon, is derived from the Latin saeculum.

See also 
Aeon, comparable Greek concept 
Century
Generation
In saecula saeculorum
 New world order (politics)
Social cycle theory
Strauss-Howe generational theory
Saeculum obscurum

References

Units of time
Ageing
Latin words and phrases